Walter Henry Holke (December 25, 1892 – October 12, 1954) was a first baseman in Major League Baseball. He played for the New York Giants, Boston Braves, Philadelphia Phillies, and Cincinnati Reds. Holke holds the record for the most put-outs by an infielder in a game, with 46 during a 26-inning game between the Boston Braves and the Brooklyn Dodgers on May 1, 1920.

Holke played for the Giants in the 1917 World Series against the Chicago White Sox. His double drove in the first run of Game 3 at the Polo Grounds, which the Giants won 2-0. He batted .286 (6-for-21) with 2 runs and 1 RBI.

In 1923, his first season playing for the Philadelphia Phillies, Holke had a career-high 175 hits and a batting average of .311. He finished his career two years later with a total of 1,278 hits.

In 1,212 games over 11 seasons, Holke posted a .287 batting average (1,278-for-4,456) with 464 runs, 24 home runs and 486 RBI. He finished his career with a .993 fielding percentage.

References

External links

1892 births
1954 deaths
Major League Baseball first basemen
New York Giants (NL) players
Boston Braves players
Philadelphia Phillies players
Cincinnati Reds players
St. Louis Browns coaches
Minor league baseball managers
Baseball players from St. Louis
Peoria Distillers players
St. Joseph Drummers players
Davenport Blue Sox players
Spokane Indians players
Rochester Hustlers players
Indianapolis Indians players
Quincy Indians players
Hazleton Mountaineers players
Terre Haute Tots players